Gurun Princess Rong'an (20 June 1855 – 5 February 1875) was a princess of the Qing Dynasty, and the only daughter of the Xianfeng Emperor and his Consort Li. She was born in the fourth year of the reign of the Xianfeng Emperor. She married Fuzhen of the Gūwalgiya clan in August 1873, on the order of Empress Dowager Cixi in accordance with Manchu imperial customs. She was pregnant when she heard news of the death of her half brother, the Tongzhi Emperor. The emotional stress caused her to suffer a miscarriage. She died a month later at the age of 19 without any children.

Ancestry

Notes

References

1855 births
1875 deaths
Qing dynasty princesses
People from Beijing
Daughters of emperors

Deaths_in_childbirth